Herbert Vollrath Kohler Jr. (February 20, 1939 – September 3, 2022) was an American billionaire businessman, a member of the Kohler family of Wisconsin, and the executive chairman of the Kohler Company, a manufacturing and hospitality company in Kohler, Wisconsin, best known for its plumbing products, golf courses, and resorts, with the latter two fields of business directly entered into under his chairmanship. Before his death, Forbes estimated the net worth for him and his family at US$8.8 billion.

Early life and education
Kohler was born February 20, 1939, to Ruth Miriam DeYoung Kohler (1906–1953) and Herbert Vollrath Kohler Sr. (1891–1968), who ran the Kohler Company from 1937 until his death. He is related to other former company presidents, including Walter J. Kohler Sr. and Walter J. Kohler Jr. He graduated from The Choate School in 1957 (now Choate Rosemary Hall, Wallingford, Connecticut), and served as its chairman of the board of trustees from 2005–10. He graduated in 1965 from Yale University with a degree in Industrial Administration and went to work for the company. In June 1972, he was elected chairman of the board and chief executive officer at the age of 33.

Business career

As a teenager, Kohler worked as a laborer or technician for every division of Kohler Co., which specialised in manufacturing plumbing products.  He was awarded a bachelor's degree in industrial administration in 1965 by Yale University.  After graduation he joined the Kohler Company full time and, in 1972, was appointed chief executive officer.

The National Kitchen and Bath Hall of Fame inducted Kohler in its founding year of 1989, followed by the National Housing Hall of Fame in 1993. Junior Achievement inducted him into its U.S. Business Hall of Fame in 2006. Kohler has also received the "Legend in Leadership Award" from the Chief Executive Leadership Institute of the Yale School of Management. As of 2021, Kohler's net worth was $9.8 billion.

In April 2015, the company announced Kohler was stepping down as CEO and relinquishing the title to his son, David Kohler, while remaining executive chairman.

Golf
Kohler was a golf fan, and the Kohler Company owns and operates four courses designed by Pete Dye. The first course was constructed at Blackwolf Run, Wisconsin, in 1988.  A second 18-hole course was added to the site in 1990 and it went on to host the 1998 U.S. Women's Open.  In 1998 Kohler added 36 holes at Whistling Straits, also in Wisconsin, which has hosted the PGA Championship in 2004, 2010 and 2015, the U.S. Senior Open in 2007, and the Ryder Cup in 2021.

In 2009, Kohler purchased "one of the sport's most famous buildings", Hamilton Hall, now known as the Hamilton Grand, a collection of 26 luxury apartments. Kohler also owned the Old Course Hotel in St Andrews, Scotland.

Kohler Environmental Center 
In 2012, the Kohler Environmental Center (KEC) at Choate Rosemary Hall was inaugurated. The building was named after Herbert Kohler, who donated the $20 million required to build it. The KEC is situated on a  plot of forest and wetlands, which can be incorporated into classes focused on the environment.

Personal life
In 1961, Kohler married Linda Karger (1939–2005), but the couple divorced in the early 1980s. They had three children together. Their daughter, Rachel Kohler, is married to Mark Hoplamazian, CEO of Hyatt since 2006. In 1985, Linda married Roger Anderson, retired chairman and CEO of Continental Illinois.

Kohler appeared in the film Open Range (2003), which starred, and was directed by, his friend Kevin Costner.

His second wife was Natalie Black, a Stanford University graduate who joined Kohler in 1985 as a lawyer, rising to general counsel and senior vice president of communications. She is now head of the Kohler Foundation.

Kohler owned a breeding facility where he has bred many Morgan horses. He was the owner of the Morgan horse Noble Flaire from 1984 until its death in 2006.

He died on September 3, 2022, in Kohler, Wisconsin, at the age of 83.

See also
 Mount Kohler, named after Kohler and his sister, Ruth DeYoung Kohler II in Antarctica

References

External links

1939 births
2022 deaths
Place of birth missing
Kohler Company
American billionaires
American chief executives of manufacturing companies
Businesspeople from Chicago
Businesspeople from Wisconsin
Choate Rosemary Hall alumni
Yale University alumni
People from Kohler, Wisconsin
Kohler family of Wisconsin